Roger Kirwan (3 January 1878 – 8 January 1959) was an Irish Gaelic footballer. His championship career with the Waterford, Wexford and Kerry senior teams spanned ten seasons from 1898 until 1907.

Born in Kilmacthomas, County Waterford, Kirwan was one of five sons born to Patrick and Catherine Kirwan (née McGrath). He was educated locally and later worked as a bank official.

At club level Kirwan first played competitive football with Lismore Blackwater Ramblers, with whom he won a county senior championship medal in 1899. Kirwan later enjoyed championship success with the Camblin Rovers club in Wexford before ending his club career with the Castleisland Desmonds club in County Kerry.

Kirwan first played on the inter-county scene as a member of the Waterford senior team that was defeated by Dublin in the 1898 All-Ireland final. He later lined out with Wexford before making his debut with the Kerry senior team in 1902. Kirwan went on to win back-to-back All-Ireland medals with Kerry in 1903 and 1904. He also won three successive Munster medals.

Honours

Lismore Blackwater Ramblers
Waterford Senior Football Championship (1): 1898

Kerry
All-Ireland Senior Football Championship (2): 1903, 1904
Munster Senior Football Championship (3): 1903, 1904, 1905

References

1878 births
1959 deaths
Waterford inter-county Gaelic footballers
Wexford inter-county Gaelic footballers
Kerry inter-county Gaelic footballers